Ejner Augsburg (26 April 1892 – 26 October 1971) was a Danish modern pentathlete. He competed at the 1920 Summer Olympics.

References

External links
 

1892 births
1971 deaths
Danish male modern pentathletes
Olympic modern pentathletes of Denmark
Modern pentathletes at the 1920 Summer Olympics
People from Roskilde
Sportspeople from Region Zealand